Walter Garrett Riddick (September 13, 1883 – July 31, 1953) was a United States circuit judge of the United States Court of Appeals for the Eighth Circuit.

Education and career

Born in Gainesville, Arkansas, Riddick attended Washington and Lee University and received a Bachelor of Laws from the University of Arkansas School of Law in 1908. He was an attorney for the Missouri Pacific Railroad from 1908 to 1913. He was in private practice in Little Rock, Arkansas from 1913 to 1942.

Federal judicial service

Riddick was nominated by President Franklin D. Roosevelt on December 1, 1941, to the United States Court of Appeals for the Eighth Circuit, to a new seat created by 54 Stat. 219. He was confirmed by the United States Senate on December 16, 1941, and received his commission on December 19, 1941. Riddick served in that capacity until his death on July 31, 1953.

References

Sources
 

1883 births
1953 deaths
Judges of the United States Court of Appeals for the Eighth Circuit
United States court of appeals judges appointed by Franklin D. Roosevelt
20th-century American judges
University of Arkansas School of Law alumni